Chrysoprasis bicolor is a species of beetle in the family Cerambycidae. It was described by Olivier in 1790.

References

Chrysoprasis
Beetles described in 1790